Richard J. Duckett (March 25, 1933 – March 10, 2021) was 
an American former professional basketball player. Duckett was selected in the 1957 NBA Draft (second round, ninth overall) by the Cincinnati Royals after a collegiate career at St. John's. He played for the Royals for one season followed by two years playing in the Eastern Professional Basketball League for the Hazelton Hawks.

References

https://www.legacy.com/obituaries/naplesnews/obituary.aspx?n=richard-joseph-duckett-dick&pid=198165495

External links
 Dick Duckett @ TheDraftReview

1933 births
2021 deaths
American men's basketball players
Basketball players from New York City
Cincinnati Royals draft picks
Cincinnati Royals players
Point guards
Sportspeople from Brooklyn
St. John's Red Storm men's basketball players